Morozovo is a rural locality (a selo) in Krasnoyarskoye Rural Settlement, Zhirnovsky District, Volgograd Oblast, Russia. The population was 45 as of 2010. There are 10 streets.

Geography 
Morozovo is located in steppe of Khopyorsko-Buzulukskaya Plain, on the left bank of the Dobrinka River, 49 km southeast of Zhirnovsk (the district's administrative centre) by road. Krasny Yar is the nearest rural locality.

References 

Rural localities in Zhirnovsky District